The Shin Kong Life Nangang Tower is a 20-story,  high-rise office building completed in 2018 and located in Nangang District, Taipei, Taiwan. The first to ninth floors of the building are office spaces and the 10th to 20th floors house The Place Taipei, a five-star hotel.

See also 
 Shin Kong Life Tower
 Shin Kong Manhattan Building
 Lè Architecture
 Pxmart Headquarters

References

2018 establishments in Taiwan
Office buildings completed in 2018
Skyscraper office buildings in Taipei
Skyscraper hotels in Taipei